The following tables compare general and technical information for a variety of web hosting control panel software packages.

License and operating system support

Free and open source control panels

Proprietary control panels

Remote access 
Some control panels allow shell (console) access to the underlying OS through a Java applet, requiring that the client-side computer use Java Virtual Machine software. Other control panels allow direct access using telnet or secure shell (SSH).

Email management 
While all control panel software below supports multiple email accounts, the features they provide vary.

References

Web hosting control panels
Web server management software